La Memo (born 8 January 1995) is an Indonesian rower. He competed at the 2016 Summer Olympics in Rio de Janeiro, in the men's single sculls. He is one of the first Indonesians to compete in rowing at the Olympics alongside Dewi Yuliawati. He qualified for the Olympics because of his performance at the 2016 Asia & Oceania Continental Qualification Regatta in Chungju, South Korea.

References

External links
 

1995 births
Living people
Indonesian male rowers
Rowers at the 2014 Asian Games
Rowers at the 2018 Asian Games
Asian Games medalists in rowing
Asian Games silver medalists for Indonesia
Medalists at the 2018 Asian Games
Rowers at the 2016 Summer Olympics
Sportspeople from Maluku (province)
Olympic rowers of Indonesia
Southeast Asian Games gold medalists for Indonesia
Southeast Asian Games bronze medalists for Indonesia
Southeast Asian Games medalists in rowing
Competitors at the 2013 Southeast Asian Games
Competitors at the 2015 Southeast Asian Games
Competitors at the 2021 Southeast Asian Games
21st-century Indonesian people